Lamis Alhussein Abdel Aziz (born 24 April 1998) is an Egyptian tennis player.

On 31 January 2022, she achieved her career-high singles ranking of  606.

Playing for the Egypt Fed Cup team, she has a win–loss record of 2–5.

ITF Circuit finals

Singles: 7 (2 titles, 5 runner–ups)

Doubles: 5 (2 titles, 3 runner–ups)

External links
 
 
 

1998 births
Living people
Egyptian female tennis players
Competitors at the 2019 African Games
African Games medalists in tennis
African Games silver medalists for Egypt
Egyptian women
20th-century Egyptian women
21st-century Egyptian women